The North Shore Historic District, commonly known as Old Northeast or Historic Old Northeast, is a U.S. historic district (designated as such on February 20, 2003) located in St. Petersburg, Florida. The district, located adjacent to Downtown, is bounded by 4th Street N, 5th Avenue N, Tampa Bay, and 30th Ave N. It contains 2975 historic buildings and 4 objects. This area is mostly residential but does contain some retail, dining, parks and city landmarks. It also has been featured in the "Great Homes and Destinations" section of the New York Times.

Buildings in the district

First Church of Christ, Scientist (St. Petersburg, Florida)

See also

National Register of Historic Places listings in Pinellas County, Florida

References

External links
 Pinellas County listings at National Register of Historic Places
 Historic Old Northeast Neighborhood Association Web Site

National Register of Historic Places in Pinellas County, Florida
Historic districts on the National Register of Historic Places in Florida